"Time Won't Let Me Go" is a song by American alternative rock band The Bravery and is featured on their second album The Sun and the Moon. The song was also released as the first single from that album on March 27, 2007, in the United States (see 2007 in music). In the United Kingdom, the song was released as a single on July 9, 2007. 

The second verse contains references to Bryan Adams' hit "Summer of '69" and Cherry Valance, a character from S. E. Hinton's novel The Outsiders. The song is used on the pilot episode of Gossip Girl, the fifth season Las Vegas episode "Run, Cooper Run", the soundtrack of the movie Never Back Down, the Leverage episode "The Snow Job" & in an episode of the fifth season of One Tree Hill.

Music video
The video was directed by Brian Palmer and Brad Palmer of the production company Surround. The video concept is based on a loner kid who spaces out in a cafe and builds a house of cards which he escapes into. It features Guinness World Record Holder Bryan Berg, who holds the record for highest house of cards. The video debuted on AOL music, and was successful on VH1's Top 20 Video Countdown, reaching as high as #2.

Official Remixes
 Tall Paul Remix
 Tall Paul Remix Edit
 Tall Paul Dub
 Ultradonkey Remix
 Ultradonkey Remix Edit
 Van She Tech Remix
 Van She Tech Dub

Chart positions
"Time Won't Let Me Go" entered Billboard's Modern Rock Tracks chart on March 31, 2007 at #40. It peaked at #10 on the chart, giving the band their first top 10 hit. However, it was a massive disappointment in the UK, failing to chart at all, receiving hardly any radio airplay, although it is still tracklisted on Asda FM.

Weekly charts

Year-end charts

References

External links
 The Bravery - official website, contains audio stream of this song.

2007 singles
The Bravery songs
Song recordings produced by Brendan O'Brien (record producer)
Songs written by Sam Endicott
2007 songs
Island Records singles
Polydor Records singles